Tatsuki Yoshino ( born 13 July 1994) is a Japanese handball player for Toyota Auto Body and the Japanese national team.

He represented Japan at the 2019 World Men's Handball Championship.

References

1994 births
Living people
Japanese male handball players
Handball players at the 2018 Asian Games
Asian Games competitors for Japan
Handball players at the 2020 Summer Olympics